The Copa del Rey 1918 was the 18th staging of the Copa del Rey, the Spanish football cup competition.

The competition started on 8 April 1918, and concluded on 2 May 1918 with the final, held at the O'Donnell in Madrid, in which Real Unión lifted the trophy for the second time with a 2–0 victory over Madrid FC with Juan Legarreta netting both goals for Unión.

Teams
 North Region: Real Unión
 Central Region: Madrid FC
 South Region: Recreativo de Huelva
Galicia: Fortuna de Vigo
Asturias: Sporting de Gijón
Catalonia: RCD Español

Quarter-finals
Recreativo de Huelva and Fortuna de Vigo received a bye to the semi-finals. Real Unión and Sporting Gijón played a single match at a neutral venue, instead of a two-legged tie.

First leg

Second leg

RCD Español  and Madrid CF won one match each. At that year, the goal difference was not taken into account. A replay match was played.

Replay

Madrid FC advanced to the semi-finals

One-legged game

This was a one-legged match, played on neutral ground. Real Unión advanced to the semi-finals.

Semifinals

First leg

Second leg

Madrid FC won 2–0 on aggregate matches.

One-legged game

This was a one-legged match, played on neutral ground, and it was Real Unión who advanced to the final with a 4–1 win.

Final

References

External links
RSSSF.com
LinguaSport.com

1918
1918 domestic association football cups
1917–18 in Spanish football